William W. Joyner (born c. 1831) was a Michigan politician.

Political life
Joyner served as Flint Post Office's Postmaster.  He was elected as the Mayor of the City of Flint in 1884 serving a 1-year term.

References

Mayors of Flint, Michigan
1830s births
Year of death missing